Paulina Piechota (born 14 May 1999) is a Polish swimmer. She competed in the women's 800 metre freestyle event at the 2017 World Aquatics Championships.

References

External links
 

1999 births
Living people
Place of birth missing (living people)
Polish female freestyle swimmers
Swimmers at the 2015 European Games
European Games competitors for Poland
20th-century Polish women
21st-century Polish women